Hartman H. Lomawaima (November 11, 1949 – July 8, 2008) was the first Native American director of the Arizona State Museum.  He was only the fifth director in the history of the museum. He also was the first Native American to hold a position as director of a state agency in Arizona, and was on the board of trustees for the Smithsonian's National Museum of the American Indian in Washington, D.C.

Lomawaima was a Hopi born in the village of Supawlavi on Second Mesa, Arizona. He graduated from Northern Arizona University, and did his graduate work at Harvard University. Lomawaima first job was as a senior administrative officer at the
Hearst Museum of Anthropology, University of California at Berkeley. He and his wife, Tsianina Lomawaima, subsequently moved to the University of Washington, where he taught.
 
In 1984, Lomawaima became the associate director at the Arizona State Museum, and professor of American Indian studies at the University of Arizona. He was appointed interim director of the museum in 2002 upon the resignation of the previous director and became the permanent director in 2004.

External links
  accessed July 11, 2008
 Brosseau, Carli (July 10, 2008) "AZ museum director Lomawaima dies" Tucson Citizen accessed July 11, 2008
 Arizona State Museum Website (July 10, 2008)
 Allen, Lee (July 21, 2008) "Holy Road: Native cultural icon Hartman Lomawaima dies at 58" Indian Country Today accessed July 28, 2008

1949 births
2008 deaths
Directors of museums in the United States
Northern Arizona University alumni
Harvard University alumni
University of Washington faculty
University of Arizona faculty